The Genealogy (족보 - Jokbo) is a 1979 South Korean film directed by Im Kwon-taek.

Synopsis
During the era of Japanese occupation, Sol Jin-young, a Korean patriarch refuses to obey the law to change the family's name to a Japanese name. Tani, a member of the Japanese occupation forces, is sent to persuade Sol to comply with the order. Tani is conflicted between his duty, his respect for Korean culture and his attraction to Sol's daughter.

Cast
 Joo Sun-tae
 Hah Myung-joong
 Han Hye-sook
 Choi Nam-Hyun
 Kim Sin-jae
 Yoon Yang-ha
 Ju Sang-ho
 Kim Seok-hun
 Dok Go-sung

Notes

Bibliography
 
 
 

1979 films
Films directed by Im Kwon-taek
1970s Korean-language films
South Korean drama films